Believe is the fourth studio album by American rock band Legendary Shack Shakers, released in 2004.

Musical style 
The music of Believe encompasses rockabilly, klezmer, country, punk rock, blues, cowpunk, polka-klezmer, psychobilly and Southern Gothic.

Reception 

Believe was favourably reviewed by Zeth Lundy of PopMatters, who concluded, "The next time you take the O Brother, Where Art Thou? soundtrack from the stereo, pining for some oomph to your Americana, reach for Th’ Legendary Shack Shakers. “Colonel” J.D. Wilkes calls himself a jumpin’ jimdaddy, and before long, you will too." Ben Donnelly of Dusted magazine reviewed the album and commented that "Translating this band's strengths to record will probably always be a challenge. ... Still, they make the most of the challenge."

Track listing 
All songs written by J. D. Wilkes except where noted
 "Agony Wagon" – 2:57
 "Creek Cats" – 3:21
 "Where's the Devil... When You Need Him?" – 2:59
 "Piss and Vinegar" – 2:46
 "County of Graves" – 3:45
 "All my Life to Kill" – 3:03
 "Cussin' in Tongues" – 2:45
 "Help Me" – 3:47 (Sonny Boy Williamson II)
 "Bible Cyst" – 2:55
 "The Pony to Bet on" – 3:28
 "Fistwhistle Boogie" – 2:22
 "Misery Train" – 1:01

Personnel 

 J.D. Wilkes - vocals, Harmonica, Piano, Wurlitzer Piano, Toy Piano, Wind-up monkey, See 'n Say 
 Mark Robertson - Guitar, Double Bass, Bass guitar 
 Paulie Simmons - drums 
 DavidLee - Acoustic Guitar, Electric Guitar

Additional personnel include: Jordan Richter, Nick Kane (guitar), Fats Kaplan (banjo, fiddle, accordion), Donnie Herron (fiddle), Jim Hoke (clarinet, saxophone).

References 

2004 albums
Gothic country albums
Legendary Shack Shakers albums
Punk rock albums by American artists